Thomas Butler of Cahir (1448-1476)  was the grandson of James "Gallda" Butler who was the third son of James Butler, 3rd Earl of Ormond.
He was born and died in Cahir Castle, Tipperary, Ireland.

Marriage and issue
He married Catherine Power (1430-1524)  and together they had three sons:
 Thomas Butler (d.1558) who was created Baron Cahir in 1543. This title became extinct on the death of his only son Edmund Butler, 2nd Baron Cahir in 1560.
 Piers Butler (d.1539) who was the father of Theobald Butler in whose favour the peerage was revived in 1583.
Edmund Butler (1470-1560)

See also
 Butler dynasty

References

15th-century Irish people
Year of birth uncertain
1476 deaths
Thomas
1448 births